Beautiful But Dumb is a 1928 American silent romantic comedy film directed by Elmer Clifton and starring Patsy Ruth Miller, Charles Byer and George E. Stone.

A stenographer has a makeover and schemes to snare her boss.

Cast
 Patsy Ruth Miller as Janet Brady
 Charles Byer as James Conroy
 George E. Stone as Tad
 Shirley Palmer as Beth
 Eileen Sedgwick as Mae 
 William Irving as Ward
 Harvey Clark as Broadwell

References

Bibliography
 Munden, Kenneth White. The American Film Institute Catalog of Motion Pictures Produced in the United States, Part 1. University of California Press, 1997.

External links
 

1928 films
1928 comedy films
1920s English-language films
American silent feature films
Silent American comedy films
American black-and-white films
Films directed by Elmer Clifton
Tiffany Pictures films
1920s American films